Thomas Broughton may refer to:

Thomas Broughton (writer) (1704–1774), English divine, biographer, and miscellaneous writer
Thomas Broughton (divine) (1712–1777), English divine
Thomas Duer Broughton (1778–1835), English writer on India
Thomas Robert Shannon Broughton (1900–1993), Canadian classics scholar
Thomas Broughton (acting governor) (1668–1737), lieutenant-governor of South Carolina from 1730 to 1737
Thomas Broughton (Australian politician) (1810–1901), mayor of Sydney, Australia in 1847 and member of the Parliament of New South Wales in 1859–1860
Sir Thomas Broughton, killed 16 June 1487 at the Battle of Stoke Field